Track 16 is a contemporary art gallery in the fashion district neighborhood of downtown Los Angeles, exhibiting the work of contemporary artists.

History 
Track 16 co-founded the gallery hub Bergamot Station in 1994. In the early years of the gallery, they staged exhibits with the artworks of Man Ray, Manuel Ocampo, the early Punk scene in L.A. ("Forming"), and contemporary Latin American art ("Amnesia", "While Cuba Waits").

Track 16 now resides in the historic Bendix Building, along with several other contemporary art galleries.

Artists 
 Estate of Pedro Alvarez
Debra Broz
Robbie Conal
Marsian De Lellis
Simone Gad
Janie Geiser
Don Ed Hardy
Laura Heit
Kathleen Henderson
Alexander Iskin
Galia Linn
Burt Payne 3
 Elyse Pignolet
Mondongo
Ann Summa
Camilla Taylor
Eve Wood
Noa Yekutieli

Selected exhibitions 

 2008: Don Ed Hardy, When East Meets West
 2008: Robbie Conal, No Spitting No Kidding
 2018: Robbie Conal, Cabinet of Horrors
2019: Marsian De Lellis, Simone Gad, Debra Broz, Stuck Together
 2019: Elyse Pignolet, You Should Calm Down
 2020: Rakeem Cunningham and Clifford Prince King, INSTALLATION #000000
2021: Galia Linn, Beauty Queen, Heartbreaker, High Maintenance
2021: John Collins, Moonlight Graham

References 

Art galleries established in 1994
Art museums and galleries in Los Angeles
Downtown Los Angeles
1994 establishments in California